Cysteate synthase is an enzyme with systematic name sulfite:O-phospho-L-serine sulfotransferase (phosphate-hydrolysing, L-cysteate-forming). This enzyme catalyses the following chemical reaction

 O-phospho-L-serine + sulfite  L-cysteate + phosphate

This enzyme is a pyridoxal-phosphate protein.

References

External links 

EC 2.5.1